Pritam Nirala (born 23 December 1994) is an Indian cricketer. He made his first-class debut for Sikkim in the 2018–19 Ranji Trophy on 28 November 2018. He made his Twenty20 debut for Sikkim in the 2018–19 Syed Mushtaq Ali Trophy on 2 March 2019.

References

External links
 

1994 births
Living people
Indian cricketers
Place of birth missing (living people)
Sikkim cricketers